The battle of Rohtas took place in summer of 1764 between the Durranis and the Sikh Misls. The battle resulted in Sikh Victory with the capture of the city of Rohtas Fort and its governor Sarbuland Khan.

Background
In February 1764, the Sikhs captured Lahore and killed commander Khwaja Ubaid Khan whereas the governor, Kabuli Mall, submitted to the Sikhs with agreement to pay large tribute and a stay for Hari Singh Bhangi's Vakil, Tek Chand, in Lahore with salary of 10 rupees per day. The government in the Punjab region on the east of Chenab was reduced to vassal of the Sikhs whereas the north west region between Chenab and Jhelum to Multan in the South west was brought under the control of Charat Singh and Bhangi Sikhs by summer of 1764. After crossing Chenab, Charat Singh and Gujjar Singh entered into Chaj Doab where they overpowered the resistance by Afghans and then moved forward beyond Jhelum towards Rohtas.

Battle
Sarbuland Khan, uncle of Ahmad Shah Abdali, with a strong force of 12,000 soldiers opposed the Sikhs but they were defeated and forced back inside the fort. The Fort fell under siege but then Charat Singh set up a trap by acting to move away and lifting the siege. Watching the Sikhs retreat, Sarbuland Khan came out of the fort with his remaining soldiers to pursue them but Charat Singh turned back and rushed to capture the fort where many Afghans were killed and their baggages were plundered whereas Sarbuland Khan was captured.

Aftermath
After the capture, Sarbuland Khan, who was pleased with the well treatment and respect given to him by Sikhs, offered himself to serve as governor for Charat Singh but upon Charat Singh's refusal to appoint him as governor, Sarbuland Khan paid 200,000 rupees for his freedom to return home.

References 

Battles involving the Durrani Empire
Battles involving the Sikhs